Michael S. Bernick (born October 1, 1952) is an American lawyer. He served as Director of California's labor department, the Employment Development Department (EDD), from 1999 to 2004. He is a practitioner and theorist of job training and employment strategies. For over 40 years, he has developed job training projects on the state and local level in California and written about strategies for expanding the middle class and achieving fuller employment.

In a series of articles and books written during the 1980s and 1990s, drawing on his experience in community job training, he argues against the then-expanding social welfare system. He sets out alternative strategies of inner city entrepreneurship and market-based training and job ladders.

In the 2000s, his projects, first at the EDD and then through the California Workforce Association (CWA), include ones of worker retraining and reemployment, improving the income of low-wage workers, and employment for workers who have been unable to find steady work. He has written regularly on these topics, including a volume on the lessons of training programs over the past fifty years and two volumes on expanding jobs for workers with developmental and neurological differences.

Early life and education
Bernick grew up in Los Angeles through Fairfax High School. A marathon runner in the 1960s, he was active in the long-distance running subculture of Southern California at that time. He attended Harvard University (B.A. 1974), Oxford University (Balliol College, B. Phil. 1976) and the University of California, Berkeley Law School (J.D. 1979). He spent his final year of law school in Washington DC researching a monograph on judge J. Skelly Wright.

Career in the Employment Field
After graduating from law school in 1979, he spent much of the next seven years as executive director of the San Francisco Renaissance Center, a community job training agency that operated a series of literacy and vocational training classes, an early welfare to work program, and five business ventures providing transitional employment. In 1986 Bernick went into private law practice with the law firm of Arnelle and Hastie but remained a board member of several community job training agencies until being appointed EDD Director in 1999.

Following the recall of California Governor Gray Davis, Bernick returned to law in San Francisco at Sedgwick LLP (2004-2017) and later at Duane Morris LLP (2018–present). He also joined the Milken Institute in 2004 as a fellow in employment policy. He became research director of CWA, a position that continues today. In 2011, he helped create and continues to direct the Autism Job Club of the Bay Area.

1980s and 1990s: Criticism of the Welfare State, and Developing Market-Oriented Job Creation and Training
In the early 1980s, Bernick began a series of articles and books on job training and employment, written from a practitioner's viewpoint. The Dreams of Jobs (1982) reviewed the job training programs in San Francisco from 1960 to 1980 and was followed a few years later by Urban Illusions (1986), covering job training experiences at the Renaissance Center.

Bernick was an early proponent of what became welfare reform under President Bill Clinton, and of market-based approaches to vocational and literacy training. He also argued for strategies of inner city entrepreneurship and inner city loan funds.

After becoming EDD Director in 1999, Bernick continued to write about training strategies, particularly job ladders for low-wage workers and employment for workers with disabilities. His 2006 book, Job Training That Gets Results is an attempt to summarize lessons learned from the job training programs of the past 50 years. It contains the themes of market-oriented training and entrepreneurship, the professionalization of the low-wage workforces, the role of extra-governmental entities, and the restructuring of government social services structures.

2000s: Expanding the Middle Class and Fuller Employment
After leaving EDD in 2004, Bernick's job training projects and writing have continued through CWA, the association of local workforce boards in California, and some independent workforce intermediaries.

With CWA, he has developed several pilot projects, utilizing the emerging internet job search and placement tools, expanding the apprenticeship approach to non-traditional fields, testing reemployment strategies for the long-term unemployed, and testing public service employment for adults with developmental differences. He has joined La Cooperativa, Growth Sector, Transmosis, and other workforce intermediaries in implementing worker retraining for growth occupations in engineering, health care, trucking, and information technology.

His writing has chronicled the evolution of California industries and jobs and examined various employment issues. In twice-monthly California employment postings dating from early 2009 for the website Fox & Hounds, he chronicled the large scale job losses in California employment during the Great Recession and the subsequent employment recovery. In essays for Zocalo Public Square and other journals, he examined the breakdown in full-time employment and rise of alternative forms of employment, the projected growth of the "non-knowledge economy," the evolving forms of job placement, policies that restrict job creation, crowdfunding and anti-poverty impacts, and why most approaches today to wage inequality are ineffective. Since 2016, Bernick has been a regular contributor to Forbes on employment law and policies.

Underlying much of this writing are themes of expanding the middle class and achieving this expansion through an employment strategy. He argues against the movements on the left toward guaranteed income and benefits expansion and proposes alternative employment strategies. He also argues for "work first" approaches that emphasize placement into jobs, with training and advancement to follow. He emphasizes government planning and direction limitations and the roles of extra-governmental networks and groups in employment programs.

The Autism Job Club
Bernick has been involved since 2004 in a series of projects involving adults on the autistic spectrum. He was part of teams developing programs for persons with autism at California State University East Bay and at William Jessup University. He helped develop The Specialists Guild, employing persons with autism in software testing, and the Autism Job Club, for building extra-governmental autism employment networks.

He has published two volumes on employment for adults with developmental and neurological differences. The Autism Job Club: The Neurodiverse Workforce in the New Normal of Employment (2015) sets out the individual and collective strategies for increasing employment among adults on the autistic spectrum. The Autism Full Employment Act (2021) discusses the next stages of jobs for adults with autism, ADHD, and other learning and mental health differences. A third volume in this series is scheduled for 2024.

Transit Village Movement
In 1988 Bernick was elected to the board of directors of the Bay Area Rapid Transit (BART) rail system and soon began to note the lack of land development linked to rail. With UC Berkeley Professor Robert Cervero, he established a research center at UC Berkeley focused on the link between land use and transit, and together they published a series of articles leading to their 1996 book, Transit Villages in the 21st Century. The book helped to develop and popularize the transit village concept. Bernick served on the BART Board for eight years.

Controversy
Veteran Bay Area investigative reporters Matier & Ross wrote in the San Francisco Chronicle in June 1996 that BART Director Michael Bernick "accepted campaign contributions from BART contractors". Moreover, "excerpts of a federal wire tap [released in connection with indictments] showed that Bernick regularly talked to contractors about extending a deal for them at the same time they were helping to raise campaign contributions for his re-election."

California State Library Collection of Writings
In October 2015, the California State Library opened a collection of Bernick's writings and papers. The Collection includes over 200 articles by Bernick covering 35 years, as well as background material on his six books and two additional book projects-The Jobs Perplex and Real Work. The main section of the collection focuses on job training and employment strategies. The collection also includes sections on the transit village movement in California, autism employment and inclusion, California government, and the long distance running sub-culture of Southern California.

References

Living people
Lawyers from San Francisco
Writers from San Francisco
1952 births
Harvard University alumni
UC Berkeley School of Law alumni
Alumni of Balliol College, Oxford